Saint-Servais is the name of two communes in France:

 Saint-Servais, Côtes-d'Armor, a commune in the Côtes-d'Armor département
 Saint-Servais, Finistère, a commune in the Finistère département
 Saint-Servais, Belgium, an old commune of Wallonia, now a part of Namur

See also
Basilica of Saint Servatius (Saint-Servais)
Saint Servatius
 Saint-Gervais, Isère